Presidential elections were held in Romania on 10 November 2019, with a second round held on 24 November 2019. Incumbent President of Romania Klaus Iohannis, first elected in 2014, was eligible for re-election. He defeated Viorica Dăncilă in the second round of the election, receiving 66 percent of the vote – the second-highest vote share on record after Ion Iliescu (who received 85% of the vote in 1990).

Background 
Klaus Iohannis  won the last presidential election in 2014 and was sworn in for his first term on 21 December 2014. According to the Article 83 of the Constitution of Romania, the "term of office of the President of Romania is five years, being exercised from the date the oath was taken,"  but only for up to two terms. In June 2018, incumbent president Iohannis publicly announced his intention of running for a second term as president. The electoral calendar for the presidential elections was set by the Romanian Government.

The final results for the first round were publicly announced by Central Electoral Bureau and Permanent Electoral Authority on 14 November 2019. The results were forwarded to the Constitutional Court of Romania that validated the results on 15 November 2019. After the Constitutional Court's validation, the results were sent for publication to the Official Journal of Romania (Monitorul Oficial al României). Only after the publication by the Official Journal, the results for the first round of the elections became official.

The Central Electoral Bureau (BEC) forwarded the final results for the second round to the Constitutional Court of Romania for validation on 28 November 2019, on the last day of the settled electoral calendar. The Constitutional Court of Romania validated the results in the same day.

Candidates

National Liberal Party (PNL) 
President Klaus Iohannis was eligible for re-election. His candidacy in the 2014 elections was supported by the National Liberal Party (PNL), whose President he was at that time. Upon taking office as president, Iohannis suspended his PNL membership, as the Constitution does not allow the president to be a formal member of a political party during his term. Ludovic Orban, the president of the PNL, reconfirmed the party's support for Iohannis after the elections. On 11 March 2018, the National Council of PNL formally endorsed Klaus Iohannis for a new term as president.

Social Democratic Party (PSD) 
Liviu Pleșoianu, a member of the Chamber of Deputies for Bucharest since 2016 for the Social Democratic Party (PSD), declared his candidacy on 23 July 2017. Liviu Dragnea, President of the Chamber of Deputies since 2016, and Gabriela Firea, Mayor of Bucharest since 2016, are thought to be other potential PSD candidates. However, both have refuted these media speculations, Firea stating she wants to finish her term as mayor, while Liviu Dragnea rejected the idea and stated he and the PSD concentrate on the governing program and the parliamentary agenda, as Dragnea is President of the Chamber of Deputies. After being convicted on corruption charges on 27 May 2019, Dragnea became ineligible to run for president.

Save Romania Union (USR) and PLUS Alliance 
Nicușor Dan, a former President of the Save Romania Union (USR), the third largest political party in the country, believed that the party should run its own candidate for the elections. Dan Barna, the new President of the USR, stated in an interview with Adevărul that the USR would have a presidential candidate, decided by a vote within the party. Barna also said that "Dacian Cioloș may be an option, like any well-known person".

Former Minister of Labor in Cioloș Government, Dragoș Pîslaru, who is among the founders of the new party of former Prime Minister, the PLUS, said the party was ready for a possible candidacy for the presidency of leader Dacian Cioloș. He also stressed that a candidacy of President Iohannis for a new term would not exclude a candidacy of Dacian Cioloș. On 8 June 2018, Cioloș said he would not run against Klaus Iohannis. However he subsequently stated that he would assume any responsibility that his recently founded political party (PLUS) would bestow upon him, not excluding the presidency.

In the aftermath of the results of the 2019 European Parliament elections, USR and PLUS decided to keep the 2020 USR-PLUS Alliance for the presidential elections, and nominated Dan Barna as joint candidate.

Other political parties 
Many voices inside ALDE suggested that Călin Popescu-Tăriceanu, the party leader and former President of the Senate, should be the proposal of the PSD–ALDE coalition for the upcoming election and asked for PSD support in this regard. Tăriceanu himself considered that the best option for the presidential election is a PSD–ALDE joint candidacy. On 24 July 2019, ALDE announced that Tăriceanu would run for president on its ticket.

In a press conference on 26 October 2017, Victor Ponta, a former Prime Minister and runner-up in the 2014 elections, claimed that his newly established party, PRO Romania, would nominate a candidate in the elections, but denied that he would run for the presidency again.

On 25 August 2019, Theodor Paleologu was designated candidate of the People's Movement Party (PMP).

On 7 July 2019, Ramona Ioana Bruynseels launched her candidacy. The announcement was met with surprise and intrigue from political commentators. Bruynseels has set her platform on taking on the broken political system in Romania that she argues is working against the interests of its citizens. Bruynseels is a centrist politician and was the candidate of the Humanist Power Party. At the time of these elections, the party was controlled from behind the scenes by Romanian mogul and former longtime Securitatea collaborator Dan Voiculescu.

Candidates qualified for the second round
On 28 November 2019, The Romanian Central Electoral Bureau (BEC) forwarded the final results to the Constitutional Court of Romania, which validated the results in the same day.

Candidates that competed only in the first round
For all these candidates, the competition ended on 15 November 2019, when the Constitutional Court of Romania validated the results of the first round (only the first two placed competitors were qualified for the second round).

Withdrawn candidates

Declined to be candidates
These individuals have been the subject of speculation, but have publicly denied or recanted interest in running for president.

Timeline

Campaign 
The electoral campaign for the first round started on 12 October 2019, 0:00 EET and ended on 9 November 2019, 7:00 EET. The electoral campaign for the second round started on 15 November 2019, 0:00 EET (several hours before the first round results were validated by the Constitutional Court of Romania) and ended on 23 November 2019, 7:00 EET. According to Romanian law, both campaigns must end at least 24 hours before the official poll openings.

Controversies
The candidate Dan Barna did not comply with the legal requirements regarding the mention of a candidate's first-degree relatives income, in the public declaration of assets (document required in a candidate's file, while registering at the Electoral Board). He stated that his wife income - who was at the time employed at Petrom - was "classified". Soon after the story sparked, he declassified his wife's annual income and changed his assets statement.

According to a media investigation, Dan Barna was allegedly involved in a financial scheme during his entrepreneurship time. He rejected the allegations.

Media released recordings of conversations that the candidate Ramona Bruynseels had with her staff, regarding allegedly dubious acts committed with her campaign funds by Dan Voiculescu, the informal leader of the party that supports her candidacy.

The candidate Ninel Peia was reported missing, during the night of 6–7 November 2019. He was seen leaving the hotel he was lodging in Cluj-Napoca, at 1:17 am, and did not return. The following morning, he was found at Putna Monastery, 195 km away, stating that he went there "to pray".

The candidate Viorel Cataramă was reported as a former informer of the infamous Securitate (Communist Romania's intelligence service). He rejected the allegations.

Alexandru Cumpănașu was accused of either forging his BA degree or lying about being a university graduate. He failed to show a Bachelor's degree, while stating that he was a university graduate, without mentioning a university or faculty. He publicly showed an honorary diploma issued by a controversial university of Ukraine, but failed to prove his claimed status of a university graduate. Later on, he mentioned in the documents filed at the Electoral Bureau that he only graduated high-school and did not pursued any university studies. Asked to clear his lack of university studies required for a Master's degree or a Doctor degree, he stated "In my opinion, I pursued university studies".

A radio anchor that hosted a live debate warned the candidate Alexandru Cumpănașu to tone down his language, or else he would be facing exclusion from the debate.

In an electoral show broadcast live by the Romanian public TV station TVR1, Alexandru Cumpănașu showed his skills of gun handling, by firing at sitting balloons. Later, he stated that the submachine gun he used "was a toy-gun".

For the first time in the history of democratic elections in Romania, the first two contenders did not participate in any electoral debate organised between them or together with other candidates.

Campaign financing
This is an overview of the money raised by each candidate, as it was reported to the Permanent Electoral Authority. Total raised are the sum of all contributions (private and public).

First round
For the first round, the candidates raised a total of 70,258,904.02 lei. Only the candidates that achieved at least 3% of the votes were entitled to be compensated for their private fundings from the state budget. According to Romanian law, the candidates that achieved less than 3% (highlighted in red, in the table below) are not entitled to public compensations. One candidate, Sebastian Popescu, claimed in his financial filing that he and his team did not spend any funds, saying that he used only the online environment for his campaign and no paid ads.

Second round
For the second round, the two remaining candidates raised a total of 1,956,000 lei.

Debates

In order for a debate to be counted, there must be at least two candidates present. Situation such as: one candidate with one or multiple interviewers; one candidate with a representative (or more) of other candidate(s); only representatives of candidates (no matter how many candidates were represented); one candidate debating a previously recorded video of other candidate(s); short live statements of a candidate (via telephone or video streaming) inserted during a show with only one (other) candidate; short coincidental encounters of candidates (in a non-previously organized debate) that spoke to each other (and were recorded, even on professional cameras in TV studios) are not to be considered proper debates. Any debate must be publicly broadcast. Negotiations behind closed doors, "strategic meetings" among candidates or any other type of discreet talks are not proper debates, even if their content (or bits of it) was released to the public, even if the candidates approved its release.

Debates may be broadcast on radio, television or internet. Candidates may show up in person or participate to the debate via telephone or video streaming for the entire debate time. Candidates that left the debate before 10% of the debate time elapsed (after few words or few minutes) are to be considered as absentees and their leaving noted as such. In this particular situation (if will occur), the debate is considered a valid one, because at least two candidates were present at its beginning. Candidates that left before the debate's ending are considered present, with their particular situation noted as such.

Schedule

Participation 
The following is a table of participating candidates in each debate:

Opinion polls

First round

After the deadline for submitting candidacies to BEC (22 September 2019)

Before the deadline for submitting candidacies to BEC (22 September 2019)

In-depths polling analysis

Notes

Graphical summary
The following graph depicts the evolution of the standing of each candidate in the poll aggregators since December 2018. The last value is the exit-polls average.

Polling aggregation
The following graph depicts the evolution of the standing of each present candidate, including former party candidates and alliance candidates since December 2018. Klaus Iohannis includes Ludovic Orban's previous evolution, Viorica Dăncilă includes Liviu Dragnea's previous evolution with Eugen Teodorovici's and Gabriela Firea's previous support, Theodor Paleologu includes Eugen Tomac's previous evolution, Dan Barna's evolution is aggregated with Dacian Cioloș' evolution and Mircea Diaconu's evolution is aggregated with Victor Ponta's, Corina Crețu's and Călin Popescu-Tăriceanu's added evolution.  The last value is the exit-polls average.

Second round

Iohannis vs. Dăncilă

Iohannis vs. Barna

Iohannis vs. Diaconu

Iohannis vs. Tăriceanu

Iohannis vs. Cioloș

Iohannis vs. Dragnea

Iohannis vs. Firea

Results 

The first round of voting was held on 10 November 2019. Incumbent president Klaus Iohannis, of the ruling National Liberal Party (PNL) led the field with 37.8 percent, with former Prime Minister Viorica Dăncilă, of the opposition Social Democratic Party (PSD) finishing second with 22.26 percent. Because no candidate obtained the support of more than 50% of registered voters, the second round was held two weeks later, on 24 November 2019, between Ioannis and Dăncilă. Exit polls on election night showed Iohannis winning handily. He ultimately finished with 66.09 percent of the vote, the second-highest vote share for a winning presidential candidate in direct, popular elections in Romania's democratic history since 1990 onwards.

Dan Barna openly endorsed Iohannis in the second round. Theodor Paleologu positioned himself as against Dăncilă, without openly endorsing Klaus Iohannis (his party, PMP, openly endorsed Klaus Iohannis). Kelemen Hunor openly endorsed Iohannis in the second round (his organization, UDMR/RMDSZ, position itself as non-partisan). Alexandru Cumpănașu positioned himself against Dăncilă, without openly endorsing Iohannis on the other hand however.

By county

First round

Second round

References

External links

President
Presidential
Presidential elections in Romania
Romania